Oil Lamps is a 1971 Czechoslovak drama film directed by Juraj Herz. It competed in the 1972 Cannes Film Festival. It is based on a novel by Jaroslav Havlíček.

Plot
In a small Czech town named Jilemnice lives a brave and jovial woman Štěpa Kiliánová, who enjoys her independent life but also desires to marry and have a family. The latter proves difficult as most potential suitors do not find her to be matching ideals of a 1900s wife. Out of excessive trust and desire to marry, she marries her cousin, a sardonic, reclusive man, former lieutenant and gambler Pavel Malina, whose only wish is to find peace and forget the past. Meanwhile the groom's father and older brother are interested in Štěpa's inheritance to save their farm from ruin. The couple live through unrequited love, dislike and disappointment on Štěpa's side, since her husband does not consummate the marriage because of his impotence, due to the syphilis he caught during his excessive life-style time in the army.

Cast
 Iva Janžurová as Štěpa Kiliánová
 Petr Čepek as Pavel Malina
 Marie Rosůlková as Mother 
 Ota Sklenčka as Father
 Vladimír Jedenáctík as Uncle
 Karel Černoch as Synáček
 Jaroslav Blažek as Trakl 
 Václav Vondráček as Tabetic Machoň

References

External links
 

1971 films
1971 drama films
Czech drama films
Czechoslovak drama films
1970s Czech-language films
Films directed by Juraj Herz
1970s Czech films